Hypomyrina fournierae, the Gabriel's orange playboy, is a butterfly in the family Lycaenidae. It is found in Sierra Leone, western Nigeria, Cameroon, Gabon, the Republic of the Congo, the north-eastern part of the Democratic Republic of the Congo and western Uganda.

References

Butterflies described in 1939
Deudorigini